This is a list of Lebanese-Armenians from Lebanon categorized by subject.

Politics
Khatchig Babikian - attorney, politician, member of Parliament, minister
Nazar Najarian -  politician, former Secretary-General of the  Kataeb Party
Arthur Nazarian - politician, Member of Parliament
Karim Pakradouni - politician, ex-Minister, former President of Phalange (Kataeb) Party
Hagop Pakradounian - politician, Member of Parliament
Others
Laury Haytayan - civic activist

Arts
Media
Zaven Kouyoumdjian - talk show host
Paula Yacoubian - TV presenter
Dr. Haroutioun Nicolian - anesthesiologist, painter, poet, art collector, critic
Neshan Der Haroutiounian - TV presenter

Music
John Dolmayan - drummer of the American band System of a Down
Harout Fazlian - principal conductor of the Lebanese Philharmonic Orchestra
Adiss Harmandian - singer
Guy Manoukian - composer, pianist
Tigran Mansurian - composer, 2004 Grammy awards nominee
Maria Nalbandian - singer
Nourhanne - singer
George Pehlivanian - musician
Nicole Saba - singer
Serj Tankian - lead vocalist, songwriter, keyboardist of American band, System of a Down
Roy Malakian - international DJ and music producer
Haig Papazian - violinist in Lebanese indie rock band Mashrou' Leila
Krikor Jangeozian - baritone singer, multiple awards recipient
Manuel Menengichian - best singer of the 60's

Others
Simon Abkarian - actor
Krikor Agopian - painter
Shaunt Basmajian - poet
Pierre Chammassian - comedian
Sylva Channessian - Miss Lebanon and Miss World Finalist 1973
Paul Guiragossian - painter
Iman, previously Liz Sarkissian - actress 
Tulip Joshi - actress and model (Indian father, Lebanese-Armenian mother)
Mkrtich Mazmanian - sculptor
Sako Shahinian - illustrator
Aram Somoundji - mobile IT expert
Mariam Nour - television personality

Religion
Aram I - Catholicoss of Great House of Cilicia

Science
Ardem Patapoutian - molecular biologist and neuroscientist, won Nobel Prize in Physiology or Medicine

Sports
Levon Altonian - former football player who played for Homenetmen and Lebanon
Mardek Chabarian - former football player who played for Lebanon
Agop Donabidian - former football player who played for Nejmeh and Lebanon
Wartan Ghazarian - former football player who played for Lebanon
Gretta Taslakian - sprinter, Olympian

See also
Armenians in Lebanon
List of Armenian Catholicoi of Cilicia headquartered in Antelias, Lebanon
List of Armenian Catholic Patriarchs of Cilicia headquartered in Beirut, Lebanon

References

 
Lists of Armenian people
Armenian